JamiQ Private Limited is a Singapore-based social media monitoring company. The company was founded by Kelvin Quee, Lee Jia Yi, and Benjamin Koe in September 2008, initially incubated with NTU Ventures. JamiQ's software uses algorithms that can understand the opinions and feelings inferred from phrases and sentences. It processes English words and denotes a positive or negative value to them. JamiQ's software also uses search engines, APIs, RSS feeds, and web crawlers to monitor social media in real-time. It specializes in monitoring Asian social media.

Products 
JamiQ offers a variety of products.

JamiQ Social Media Monitoring

JamiQ's flagship product is its automated and localised social media monitoring and measurement solution that provides coverage of social media in any language. Data mining methods and natural language processing technology are used to produce real-time buzz trending, sentiment detection, influence scoring, and market segmentation. Unlike other similar services based in the US that do not cover local markets in local languages, JamiQ offers reach and coverage of all languages and markets and does so in every language for Asia and other multilingual/segmented market regions. Algorithms developed by JamiQ can determine the location of a blog/site even if it is not hosted locally.

ReputationWatch

ReputationWatch is a reputation management service for small and medium-sized businesses and it is a collaboration between JamiQ and Singapore telecommunications company, Singapore Telecommunications (SingTel). Email alerts about local and relevant conversations on new sites and social media platforms such as blogs, forums, social networks and microblogs worldwide are sent to users.

It is built on JamiQ’s social media monitoring technology to allow businesses to track real-time online conversations about their brands in their local market and it is only available on SingTel’s myBusiness Cloud Computing portal in Singapore.

Notable Implementations

Singapore General Elections Tracker 2011

Data visualisation company, Swarm, collaborated with JamiQ to launch the Singapore General Elections 2011 Tracker. The visualisation chart displayed top mentioned keywords and trending topics discussed online, along with the most shared articles circulated on the web. The tracker aggregates news articles and blog posts from Google and Twitter data.

Visualisation on Major Telecommunications Companies in Singapore

The first of its kind in Singapore, an interactive relationship map was created by JamiQ's R&D team, showcasing how conversations and relationships on Twitter can impact the three major telecommunications companies in Singapore, namely SingTel, StarHub, and M1. The visualisation led to the publishing of a news story by The Straits Times, whereby JamiQ was interviewed, sharing insights on the situation of fake Twitter accounts making fun of well established organisations.

"World's Coolest Intern" Competition by Standard Chartered Singapore

The "World's Coolest Intern" competition is a recruitment drive for talent in Asia to help promote awareness of Standard Chartered Singapore’s online and mobile innovation, Breeze, in the social media space. The top 20 contestants were shortlisted to proceed to the second stage based on their digital footprint, which was assessed by JamiQ.

References

External links 
 jamiq.com
 Google Cache

Social media companies
Social media management platforms
Companies of Singapore